Wing Commander (1943–1969) was an American Saddlebred show horse out of the mare Flirtation Walk and by the stallion Anacacho Shamrock. Wing Commander was a chestnut with four white socks and a thin white stripe that ran from his forehead all the way to his upper lip. He was trained to be a five-gaited horse, meaning he performed the walk, trot, canter, slow gait and rack.
Through both sides of his pedigree, Wing Commander traced back to the highly influential Saddlebred stallions Rex McDonald and Bourbon King, who were themselves successful show horses.
In 1948, the stallion won his first Five-Gaited World Grand Championship, a title he kept for a total of six years. In total he won 6 Five-Gaited World Grand Championships, and was the first of only two horses to accomplish this. In 1950 Life magazine featured Wing Commander as an example of a fine athlete and an American Idol. He was owned by Dodge Stables, and trained and ridden by  Earl Teater. Wing Commander stood at stud at Castleton Farm in Lexington, Kentucky, and died at the age of 26.

Life and career
Wing Commander was foaled in 1943. He was a chestnut stallion with four white socks and a white star on his forehead. He was out of the mare Flirtation Walk and sired by the stallion Anacacho Shamrock. He was bred and owned by Dodge Stables, a part of Castleton Farm near Lexington, Kentucky which at the time was owned by Frances Dodge. 
His bloodlines traced back to  Rex McDonald and Bourbon King, who appeared on both his sire and dam's side. Wing Commander was a five-gaited Saddlebred, meaning that in addition to the default walk, trot, and canter, he also performed a slow gait and rack. He was trained by the notable Saddlebred trainer Earl Teater and groomed by Gregory Pena. Wing Commander began his show career in 1946, as a three-year-old. He won every show he entered that year, but lost twice the next year, 1947, when he was shown against older horses. Both losses ended with him placing second. In 1948 Wing Commander and Teater won the first of six World's Grand Championships at the World's Championship Horse Show, part of the Kentucky State Fair.
In addition to being shown under saddle, Wing Commander was trained to pull a fine harness cart, although he was not shown in harness. Following his show career, Wing Commander was retired to stud and was the leading Saddlebred sire from 1963 to 1968.
Wing Commander died January 19, 1969. Wing Commander was grandsire to Sky Watch, who won five World's Grand Championships, and maternal grandsire to Imperator, who won four World's Grand Championships. The two horses were also known for their "duels" or shows where they competed against each other.

Pedigree

References

Individual American Saddlebreds